The Apa Caldă is a right tributary of the river Beliș in Romania. It flows into the Beliș in Poiana Horea.

References

Rivers of Romania
Rivers of Cluj County